The Battle of Lutsk took place on the Eastern Front during World War I, from June 4 to June 6, 1916.  This was the opening attack of the Brusilov Offensive under the overall command of Alexei Brusilov.  The Russian 8th Army made a decisive breakthrough in the defenses of the Austro-Hungarian Fourth Army in the area of the city of Lutsk in Ukraine.

Battle
On the night of June 4, General Alexei Kaledin opened an artillery barrage against Archduke Joseph Ferdinand's Austro-Hungarian defenses.  Lasting through the night and into the morning, the Russian artillery broke gaps through the barbed wire trenches.  This allowed the infantry to commence a surprise attack in the vicinity of Olyka.

The complete surprise of the Russian attack caused many of the Austrians to be taken prisoner.  Some entire units surrendered without resistance while others fled in panic.  A counter-attack briefly secured the first line of trenches, but overwhelming numbers of Russian infantry pressed the attack and took the second and third line of defenses.

Within days, 130,000 Austro-Hungarian soldiers were lost.  The influential German high-command requested the dismissal of Archduke Joseph, which was subsequently granted. The success of the Russian breakthrough caused Austria to halt its attacks in Italy and convinced Romania to enter the war. The Brusilov Offensive would continue with success until running out of steam in late September 1916.

References

Lutsk
Lutsk